Aprilsasi Putri Lejarsar Variella (born 6 April 1990) is an Indonesian-born badminton player who also represented Turkey and Bahrain in international tournaments. She won the 2013 Australian Open in the women's doubles event with her partner Vita Marissa.

Achievements

BWF Grand Prix 
The BWF Grand Prix had two levels, the Grand Prix and Grand Prix Gold. It was a series of badminton tournaments sanctioned by the Badminton World Federation (BWF) and played between 2007 and 2017.

Women's doubles

 BWF Grand Prix Gold tournament
 BWF Grand Prix tournament

BWF International Challenge/Series 
Women's singles

Women's doubles

Mixed doubles

  BWF International Challenge tournament
  BWF International Series tournament
  BWF Future Series tournament

References

External links 
 

1990 births
Living people
Sportspeople from Malang
Indonesian female badminton players
Bahraini female badminton players
Turkish female badminton players
21st-century Indonesian women
20th-century Indonesian women